Mate Maleš (born 11 March 1989) is a Croatian professional footballer who plays as a midfielder in Croatian club Lokomotiva Zagreb.

Club career
Maleš started his football career with HNK Šibenik, debuting for the first team at the age of 17, on 4 August 2006 against Dinamo Zagreb. His teammates in HNK Šibenik included Ante Rukavina and Gordon Schildenfeld.

In 2007, Hajduk Split acquired Maleš and introduced him to their youth system. He was set to sign his first professional contract in February 2008, after a tournament in Hong Kong in which he played for the first team. Instead, he opted to sign a five-year deal with Dinamo Zagreb. After only two matches for his new team in the early stages of the 2008–09 season, he was loaned to Lokomotiva. In the summer of 2010, his contract with Dinamo was cancelled and Maleš signed a three-year contract with Lokomotiva. He spent one of these three seasons on loan with NK Zagreb.

Rijeka
In June 2013, Maleš signed a two-year deal with HNK Rijeka. He was a regular starter during his first season with the club. However, following a serious ankle injury, he had to undergo two surgeries, followed by long recovery periods. As a consequence, he did not play a single match from 26 March 2014 until 2 August 2015, in process missing the entire 2014–15 season, with the exception of one Rijeka II appearance in 3. HNL. Nevertheless, in May 2015, Rijeka renewed his contract for two years, tying him to the club until June 2017. Maleš scored his first ever Prva HNL goal in Rijeka's 2–1 away win against Lokomotiva on 17 October 2015. From the start of the 2016–17 season and until his departure in February 2018 Maleš served as the team captain.

Maleš was signed by Chinese Super League newcomer Dalian Yifang in February 2018. However, after Wanda Group took charge of the club at the end of February 2018 and bought Nicolás Gaitán and Yannick Carrasco from Atlético Madrid, he was excluded from the squad due to the limitation of the numbers of foreign players.

CFR Cluj
On 20 June 2018, Maleš signed a contract with Romanian defending champions CFR Cluj.

Sarpsborg 08
On 30 July 2019, Maleš signed for Sarpsborg 08 on a contract until the end of the 2020 season. On 15 August 2019 Maleš' contract was extended until the end of the 2021 season.

Arezzo
On 17 September 2020, he moved to Italian Serie C club Arezzo. On 29 January 2021, his contract was terminated by mutual consent.

International career
In 2006, Mate Maleš was selected for the national under-21 team, but despite being a regular U19 player, he never got a cap for the U21s. However, he has been called up to the Croatia squad and was in the squad for the 2014 World Cup Qualifying match against Iceland, on 19 November 2013.

He made his international debut on 5 March 2014, aged 24, in a friendly away match against Switzerland, where he was in the starting line-up and eventually replaced by Luka Modrić in 56th minute. The match ended in a 2–2 draw. He missed the 2014 FIFA World Cup due to injury.

Career statistics

Honours

Club
Rijeka
Croatian First Football League: 2016–17
Croatian Football Cup: 2013–14, 2016–17

CFR Cluj
Liga I: 2018–19
Supercupa României: 2018

References

External links

1989 births
Living people
Sportspeople from Šibenik
Association football midfielders
Croatian footballers
Croatia youth international footballers
Croatia international footballers
HNK Šibenik players
GNK Dinamo Zagreb players
NK Lokomotiva Zagreb players
NK Zagreb players
HNK Rijeka players
CFR Cluj players
Sarpsborg 08 FF players
S.S. Arezzo players
Croatian Football League players
First Football League (Croatia) players
Liga I players
Eliteserien players
Serie C players
Croatian expatriate footballers
Expatriate footballers in Romania
Expatriate footballers in Norway
Expatriate footballers in Italy
Croatian expatriate sportspeople in Romania
Croatian expatriate sportspeople in Norway
Croatian expatriate sportspeople in Italy